BYO Split Series Volume III is a split album featuring the American punk rock bands Rancid and NOFX. It was released on March 5, 2002 through BYO Records' as the third entry in their BYO Split Series.

The album contains six songs by each band, with each band's songs being covers of songs originally performed by the other band.

Two versions of this CD were released. One with a green cover, which had the songs performed by NOFX followed by the songs performed by Rancid, and one with an orange cover, which placed Rancid's songs ahead of NOFX's (the order of the songs by each band remains identical).

Following the album's release, NOFX's cover of Radio evolved into a live staple having been played at multiple NOFX shows ever since.

Track listing

References

BYO Split Series
2002 albums
NOFX albums
Rancid (band) albums
Covers albums
Albums produced by Ryan Greene